PDZ domain-containing protein 4 is a protein that in humans is encoded by the PDZD4 gene.

References

Further reading